Musée des Jacobins may refer to:
Musée des Jacobins (Auch)
Musée des Jacobins (Morlaix)
Musée des Jacobins (Saint-Sever)
Musée des Jacobins (Toulouse)